is a fictional character from the Tekken fighting game franchise by Bandai Namco Entertainment. Added to the Tekken series as a tribute to Jackie Chan, Lei's role is that of a police officer who investigates the Mishima Zaibatsu corporation's illegal activities like hunting and trading of protected species. Lei has appeared in alternate Tekken media, as a playable character in Street Fighter X Tekken and many noncanonical Tekken games, and critics have received the character positively.

Appearances

In video games
Making his debut in Tekken 2 (1995), Lei is a respected police officer who has put countless criminals behind bars, which earns him the nickname of "Super Police". While investigating the nefarious Mishima Zaibatsu corporation's illegal hunting and trading practices, he ends up fighting former fellow officer Bruce Irvin, who has switched his allegiance to Kazuya Mishima, son of Mishima Zaibatsu CEO Heihachi Mishima. After Lei defeats Bruce, Bruce escapes in a plane that later crashes, which he survives.

After the third King of the Iron Fist Tournament during the events of Tekken 3 (1998), Lei's reputation as a crime fighter wanes and his work declines after his girlfriend dumps him for his assistant. When he discovers that a syndicate will send Nina Williams to kill professional boxer Steve Fox, he sets out to stop her and restore his reputation by joining the fourth tournament in Tekken 4 (2001). Lei is successful in thwarting the assassination and captures Nina, but Steve intervenes and frees Nina by assaulting Lei. Lei nonetheless breaks up the syndicate that had dispatched Nina to the tournament.

Lei's storyline in Tekken 5 has him shipped off to Japan in pursuit of Feng Wei, who is responsible for the destruction of multiple dojos in Japan and China, including Asuka Kazama's family dojo. At the same time, he joins forces with Steve in an attempt to destroy the Mishima Zaibatsu while finding evidence behind their dubious activities, including Steve's further past. However, Feng's trail goes cold and Lei has no choice but to return to Hong Kong. In Tekken 6 (2007), Lei enters the sixth tournament in attempt to arrest Jin Kazama, as well as not forgetting his father Kazuya. In the sixth game's "Scenario Campaign" story mode, Lei is assisted by Lars Alexandersson and Alisa Bosconovitch in defeating the invading G Corporation's forces at the "ICPO Branch Office", and informs them that Kazuya has claimed the corporation by force.

Lei returned in Tekken 7 as one of the Season 2 DLC characters, although drastically redesigned. Depending on which stance he is in, Lei will utilize different Rage Drives. In his story biography, while once again investigating Kazuya's illegal activities undercover, but this time on G Corporation, Lei also planned to meet the corporation's hired mascot Lucky Chloe secretly, whom Lei is a big fan of.

Lei appears as a playable character in the noncanonical Tekken titles Tekken Card Challenge, Tekken Tag Tournament, Tekken Tag Tournament 2 and Tekken 3D: Prime Edition. He appears as a playable downloadable character in Street Fighter X Tekken.

Other media
Lei appears in the 1998 animated film Tekken: The Motion Picture, in which he is partnered with Jun Kazama to investigate the Mishima Zaibatsu's illegal activities during the tournament. Rather than actually competing in the tournament, Lei infiltrates the island's underground base with Jack-2's help. He was voiced by Akio Nakamura, and by Gray G. Haddock in the English dub.

Design and gameplay
Lei was described by Namco for Tekken 2 as "very laid back with a casual attitude. He is one of the comedy relief of the Tekken cast and is constantly cracking jokes." His fighting style and mannerisms are believed to be inspired by martial artist and actor Jackie Chan. The character is voiced in the games by Hiroya Ishimaru, Chan's Japanese voice actor. Though not mentioning Lei by name, Tekken series producer Katsuhiro Harada expressed regret in a 2015 interview with GamesRadar for having modeled many of the Tekken series characters after real-life personalities: "They may have been unique, but they didn’t really have any meaning." In 2016, Harada explained Lei's absence from Tekken 7 (2015) in that he felt the character had not been chosen enough by players to warrant his inclusion. However, in 2018, Lei was added to the roster as part of the Season 2 DLC Pack.

Lei's fighting style is canonically titled "Five Form-Based Martial Arts", further described as "five-animals-style Kung Fu, consisting of Tiger, Crane, Leopard, Snake and Dragon styles." In his 2003 book Kung Fu Cult Masters, author Leon Hunt wrote that Lei "is widely taken to be Jackie Chan, even down to his Drunken Master style, but his Shaolin animal styles … suggest a broader-based remediation of the kung fu star." According to Complex's Kevin Wong, Lei "is strictly for Tekken experts. He has seven stances to master … and a command list that is best described as overwhelming. Each new Tekken game [makes] Lei's learning curve incredibly steep." GameSpy considered Lei in Tekken 6 "one of the most versatile characters", but  "the complexity of his technique makes him a tad unaccessible to Tekken newcomers." Angelo D'Argenio of Shoryuken said of the character in Tekken Tag Tournament 2: "Lei isn’t exactly a combo character, as he relies more on his mix-ups to deal damage."

Reception

The character has received mostly positive reception from various gaming media outlets. Dave Cook of VG247 stated that Lei's "multi-stance move set" in Tekken 2 "delivered incredible depth that was foreign to the fighting genre at the time." UGO Networks placed Lei among the 50 "greatest fictional detectives of all time" in 2008, describing him as "the longtime star of the Tekken franchise". Kevin Wong of Complex named Lei the eighth-best Tekken character in 2013. Lei's Tekken Tag Tournament 2 ending features him and Marshall Law engaging in a violent sparring session at Law's restaurant; based on the characters' resemblances to Jackie Chan and Bruce Lee, respectively, 4thletter.net ranked it 163rd in their 2003 list of "The Top 200 Fighting Game Endings": "Lei is an action cop … while Law is a mediocre chef with a taste for get-rich-quick schemes. Still, such a match-up is hard to resist and Tekken Tag 2 gives us just that."

In 2015, Laurence Mozaffari of Digital Spy likened the "flip-floppy style of walking and fighting" of Star Wars character Jar Jar Binks to "another traditional martial arts style, called Zui Quan. You might recognise this brand of 'drunken kung fu' from the likes of Tekken's Lei Wulong." Gavin Jasper of Den of Geek ranked Lei 33rd in his 2017 ranking of the Tekken series' 59 characters: "Yes, it’s cool that he’s an action cop who does drunken boxing. His ability to alter his fighting style is also novel. It’s just that the writers never seemed to have much more for him to do." In an official fan poll held by Namco in 2012, he was only the 36th-most requested out of 54 Tekken characters for inclusion in Tekken X Street Fighter, receiving 3.5% (3,086) of 88,280 votes.

See also
List of Tekken characters

References

Fictional Bái Hè Quán practitioners
Fictional Chinese people in video games
Fictional martial artists in video games
Fictional Fu Jow Pai practitioners
Fictional Hong Kong people
Fictional Hung Ga practitioners
Fictional Lóng Xíng Mó Qiáo practitioners
Fictional police detectives
Fictional police officers in video games
Fictional Shé Quán practitioners
Fictional Shaolin kung fu practitioners
Fictional Zui Quan practitioners
Male characters in video games
Tekken characters
Video game characters based on real people
Video game characters introduced in 1995